was a district located in Kumamoto Prefecture, Japan.

As of 2003, the district had an estimated population of 31,088 and the density of 472.39 persons per square kilometer. The total area was 65.81;km2.

Former towns and villages
Kahoku
Kamoto
Kaō
Kikuka
Ueki

Mergers
On January 15, 2005 - the towns of Kahoku, Kamoto, Kaō and Kikuka were merged into the expanded city of Yamaga.
On March 23, 2010 - the town of Ueki, along with the town of Jōnan (from Shimomashiki District), was merged into the expanded city of Kumamoto. Kamoto District was dissolved as a result of this merger.

References

Former districts of Kumamoto Prefecture